Kerala Water Authority is  an autonomous authority established  for the development and  regulation of water supply and waste water collection and disposal in the state of  Kerala, India. It is a government-owned organization and hence a monopoly in most parts of the state. The authority was founded on 1 April 1984.  The Authority has its head office in Thiruvananthapuram. Kerala Water Authority is governed by a board chaired by the Chairman, usually the Principal Secretary / Secretary, Department of Water Resources, Government of Kerala. The board also includes the secretaries of the departments of finance, local self-government, the executive director of KRWSA, Managing Director, Technical member, Accounts Member of Kerala Water Authority  and three members from local self-government institutions.

References 

State agencies of Kerala
Water management authorities in India
Organisations based in Thiruvananthapuram
1984 establishments in Kerala
Government agencies established in 1984